Wila Wila (Aymara wila blood, blood-red, the reduplication indicates that there is a group or a complex of something, "a complex of red color") is a mountain in the Cordillera Real in the Andes of Bolivia, about  high. It is located in the La Paz Department, Larecaja Province, Guanay Municipality. It lies north-west of the mountains Chachakumani and Kuntur Jipiña. The lake Jist'aña Quta lies at its feet, south of it.

References 

Mountains of La Paz Department (Bolivia)